Nowe Warpno  (formerly ) is a historic town in northwestern Poland, within Police County in West Pomeranian Voivodeship. It lies on the shore of the Szczecin Lagoon, at the border with Germany. It is the seat of the urban-rural administrative district called Gmina Nowe Warpno. The town, located in the historic Western Pomerania, is known for its lagoon marina, a seventeenth-century timber-framed town hall and old core.

The town's population is 1,170 (according to figures for 2006). The rural part of its gmina has the lowest population density of any such division in Poland, with only 2.09 persons/km2; the town's density (48.8/km2) raises the overall population density of the gmina to 7.88/km2, still the fourth lowest in Poland.

The town is on the inlet of Neuwarp Bay on the southern shore of the Szczecin Lagoon.  Across an 800 m wide strait lies the village of Altwarp in the German part of Pomerania.  (Alt and Neu mean "old" and "new" in German; in Polish Nowe also means "new".)  A small uninhabited island being part of Nowe Warpno lies only 70 m off the coast of Altwarp.

A ferry runs between Nowe Warpno and Altwarp (Stare Warpno) across the German border.  There used to be a duty-free shop on board, but this ended when Poland joined the European Union.

Nearby Podgrodzie is in Nowe Warpno district (in the past it was a separate locality).  It lies on a picturesque headland with several vacation centres.

Nowe Warpno is a popular destination for regional tourism, and international tourists, mainly from Germany.  Available accommodation in the town includes a resort, a marina, camping, a guest house, and rooms in private homes.

Twinning cities
The sister cities of Nowe Warpno are:
  Ueckermünde, Germany
  Sande, Lower Saxony, Germany

Towns and cities near Nowe Warpno
 Police, Poland
 Szczecin (Poland)
 Eggesin (Germany)
 Ueckermünde (Germany)
 Torgelow (Germany)
 Pasewalk (Germany)

References

External links

 Official town website

Cities and towns in West Pomeranian Voivodeship
Police County